Alejandro Figueroa may refer to:
 Alejandro Figueroa (footballer, born 1980), Chilean footballer
 Alejandro Figueroa (footballer, born 1978), Colombian footballer